Ahmed Sadeq Al Khamri (Arabic: أحمد صادق الخمري; born 28 December 1992) is a Yemeni footballer who plays as a Defense currently plays for Peshmerga .

2013 Gulf Cup of Nations
Ahmed Sadeq played in the 2013 Gulf Cup of Nations with Yemen. He played three matches against Kuwait, Saudi Arabia and Iraq. But Yemen lost all their matches to come out the tournament.

References

Living people
1992 births
Yemeni footballers
Yemen international footballers
Yemeni expatriate footballers
Yemeni expatriate sportspeople in Iraq
Yemeni expatriate sportspeople in Qatar
Expatriate footballers in Iraq
Expatriate footballers in Qatar
Al-Tilal SC players
Al-Shula players
Al-Mina'a SC players
Al-Bahri players
Al Ahli SC (Doha) players
Yemeni League players
Qatar Stars League players
Association football defenders